Roman Romanovych Abramovsky (born 5 October 1973) is a Ukrainian civil servant and politician who served as Minister of Environmental Protection and Natural Resources of Ukraine from 19 June 2020 to 3 November 2021.

Biography 
In 2006, he graduated from the National Academy of Internal Affairs.

Abramovsky was a top manager of various enterprises.

From 2013 to 2014, he was an assistant to a People's Deputy of Ukraine.

In 2015, he worked as Deputy Minister of Regional Development.

From 2019 to 2020, Abramovsky served as Deputy Minister of Energy and Environmental Protection.

See also 
 Shmyhal Government

References

External links 
 Cabinet of Ministers
 

1973 births
Living people
21st-century Ukrainian politicians
People from Komsomolsk-on-Amur
Independent politicians in Ukraine
Ukrainian civil servants
Ecology and natural resources ministers of Ukraine